A list of films produced in Lithuania. For an A-Z list see :Category:Lithuanian films

Russian Empire

Republic of Lithuania 1918-1940

Lithuanian SSR

1945-1989

Lithuanian diaspora abroad

Republic of Lithuania 1990-current

1990s

2000s

2010s

2020s
 The Jump (2020)
 Vesper (2022)

External links and sources
 Lithuania film centre
 Lithuanian films at the Internet Movie Database

Lithuania

Films